Lieutenant-General Charles Willoughby Moke Norrie, 1st Baron Norrie,  (26 September 1893 – 25 May 1977), was a senior officer of the British Army who fought in both World Wars, following which he served terms as Governor of South Australia and the eighth Governor-General of New Zealand.

Military career

Early career and First World War
Educated at Eton College and at the Royal Military College, Sandhurst, he was commissioned as a second lieutenant into the British Army's 11th Hussars in 1913. He served in the First World War, in which he was awarded the Distinguished Service Order, the Military Cross and Bar, was twice mentioned in despatches, and was wounded four times. He became, successively, a Staff Captain in the 73rd Brigade; General Staff Officer Grade 3 (GSO3) in XVIII Corps; brigade major in the 90th Brigade, and in the 2nd Tank Brigade; and second GSO in the 2nd Battalion, Tank Corps. In January 1919 he changed his name by deed poll from Moke-Norrie to Norrie.

Between the wars
Between the world wars Norrie had a number of regimental and staff postings, interrupted by a year at the Staff College, Camberley in 1924. In 1931 he was promoted to lieutenant colonel and became Commanding Officer (CO) of the 10th Hussars, after which he was placed on the half-pay (inactive) list although promoted to full colonel in 1935. In January 1936, still on the half pay list, Norrie took part in the funeral procession for King George V as one of the "Representative Colonels-Commandant and Colonels of His late Majesty's Regiments". After attending the Imperial Defence College, in April 1936 he was appointed to command the 1st Cavalry Brigade as a temporary brigadier. His brigade was mechanised in 1938 and re-designated 1st Light Armoured Brigade, becoming the 1st Armoured Brigade in 1940.

Second World War

On the outbreak of the Second World War Norrie continued to serve as commander of the 1st Armoured Brigade. In April 1940 the brigade was part of the 2nd Armoured Division, which he was given temporary command of for a month between appointments of permanent commanders. Following this he was appointed acting major general and became Inspector of the Royal Armoured Corps. Four months later he became General Officer Commanding (GOC) of the 1st Armoured Division and was promoted to the permanent rank of major general in June 1941.

In November 1941 the division was ordered to Egypt where Norrie found himself appointed acting lieutenant general to command XXX Corps in the place of Vyvyan Pope, Norrie's fellow student at the Staff College in the 1920s, who had died in an air crash shortly before Norrie's arrival in Egypt. He commanded XXX Corps during Operation Crusader with some success but his tanks suffered a heavy defeat at the Battle of Gazala in June 1942. He was criticised for his "cavalry" approach to armoured warfare and General Sir Claude Auchinleck, the Eighth Army commander, replaced him in July.

He returned to Britain to be appointed Commander of the Royal Armoured Corps in which role he was to give advice on armoured warfare to General Bernard Paget, the Commander-in-Chief, Home Forces. He continued as Paget's advisor when Paget became commander of the Anglo-Canadian 21st Army Group on its formation in July 1943 but when General Bernard Montgomery assumed command early in 1944, he brought his own advisor. In April 1944 Norrie was appointed Head of the Military Mission to the French Committee of National Liberation (CFLN) in Algiers, a post he held until the middle of 1944 when he was proposed by the Secretary of State for the Dominions to become Governor of South Australia.

Norrie retired from the British Army in September 1944 to take up his post as Governor of South Australia. Although his substantive rank at this time was still major general, he was given the honorary rank of lieutenant general in retirement.

Family

Norrie was married to Jocelyn Helen Gosling on 9 June 1922. They had three children:
Diana Norrie (7 May 1923 – 6 Dec 1932);
Hon. Rosemary Norrie (born 28 March 1926), who married the 3rd Viscount Daventry; and
George Willoughby Moke Norrie (born 27 April 1936).

Jocelyn Norrie died on 7 March 1938. Norrie then married, on 28 November that year, Patricia Merryweather Bainbridge, daughter of Emerson Bainbridge. They also had three children:
Guy Bainbridge Norrie (born 3 May 1940),
Sarah Norrie (born 27 June 1943), and
Annabel Mary Adelaide Norrie (born 23 December 1945).

Norrie also had a ward, his niece Eleanor Kerans (born 21 April 1926). She had been orphaned at an early age; when she was 16 her brother was killed in the Western Desert campaign of the Second World War, leaving her with no immediate family.

Governor of South Australia

Norrie was appointed Governor of South Australia in September 1944, whereupon he was knighted as a Knight Commander of the Order of St Michael and St George (KCMG). He, his family and 12 staff arrived in Adelaide in December. The Vice-Regal couple worked hard to keep the 'Empire Spirit' alive during wartime. Within two years, Norrie had travelled to every local government area within the state, and was sure to welcome servicemen returning from war. Lady Patricia, with Rosemary and Eleanor, were regular volunteers and champions of various patriotic causes. In 1945, Norrie was made a Knight of St John, an award associated with public and charitable works.

Although normally remaining neutral in regards to local politics, he was 'shocked' at the narrow rejection of Thomas Playford's bill to nationalise the Adelaide Electric Company. He privately exerted pressure on the bill's main opponents. When the bill was reintroduced in 1946, Collier Cudmore (later Sir Collier) absented himself from key divisions, allowing the bill to pass and leading to the establishment of the Electricity Trust of South Australia.

Norrie's term was extended for four years in 1948. Despite his illustrious career, he would forever claim that his greatest achievement was the catching of a shark weighing , with rod and reel, off Port Lincoln. For part of his term as governor, his official aide-de-camp was the young Viscount Althorp (later The 8th Earl Spencer), the father of Diana, Princess of Wales.

Governor-General of New Zealand

Norrie's KCMG was promoted to Knight Grand Cross of the Order of St Michael and St George (GCMG) when he was appointed Governor-General of New Zealand in 1952, in which position he served until 1957. During his tenure he was made Knight Grand Cross of the Royal Victorian Order (GCVO) for personal services to The Queen. On leaving office, he was created a peer in 1957 as Baron Norrie, of Wellington in the Dominion of New Zealand and of Upton in the County of Gloucester. From 1960 to 1968 he was Chancellor of the Order of Saint Michael and Saint George.

Styles
Note: An asterisk (*) denotes a bar to a military award
 1893–1913: Charles Willoughby Moke Norrie
 1913–1915: Lieutenant Charles Willoughby Moke Norrie
 1915–1917: Lieutenant Charles Willoughby Moke Norrie, MC
 1917–1918: Lieutenant Charles Willoughby Moke Norrie, MC*
 1918–1919: Captain Charles Willoughby Moke Norrie, MC*
 1919–1924: Captain Charles Willoughby Moke Norrie, DSO, MC*
 1924–1931: Major Charles Willoughby Moke Norrie, DSO, MC*
 1931–1935: Lieutenant-Colonel Charles Willoughby Moke Norrie, DSO, MC*
 1935–1938: Colonel Charles Willoughby Moke Norrie, DSO, MC*
 1938–1940: Colonel (Temp. Brigadier) Charles Willoughby Moke Norrie, DSO, MC*
 1940 – June 1941: Colonel (Actg. Major-General) Charles Willoughby Moke Norrie, DSO, MC*
 June–September 1941: Major-General Charles Willoughby Moke Norrie, DSO, MC*
 September 1941–1942: Major-General (Actg. Lieutenant-General) Charles Willoughby Moke Norrie, DSO, MC*
 1942–1944: Major-General (Actg. Lieutenant-General) Charles Willoughby Moke Norrie, CB, DSO, MC*
 1944–1952: Lieutenant-General Sir Charles Willoughby Moke Norrie, KCMG, CB, DSO, MC*
 1952–1954: Lieutenant-General Sir Charles Willoughby Moke Norrie, GCMG, CB, DSO, MC*
 1954–1957: Lieutenant-General Sir Charles Willoughby Moke Norrie, GCMG, GCVO, CB, DSO, MC*
 1957–1977: Lieutenant-General The Right Honourable the Lord Norrie, GCMG, GCVO, CB, DSO, MC*

Arms

Notes

References

External links

 British Army Officers 1939–1945
 Official biography (Government House, Wellington)
 Generals of World War II
 The Arms of Lord Norrie

|-

|-

|-

|-

1893 births
1977 deaths
10th Royal Hussars officers
11th Hussars officers
Graduates of the Royal College of Defence Studies
British Army generals of World War II
British Army personnel of World War I
Companions of the Distinguished Service Order
Companions of the Order of the Bath
Governors-General of New Zealand
Governors of South Australia
Graduates of the Royal Military College, Sandhurst
Graduates of the Staff College, Camberley
Knights Grand Cross of the Order of St Michael and St George
Knights Grand Cross of the Royal Victorian Order
Knights of the Order of St John
People from Kensington
Recipients of the Military Cross
War Office personnel in World War II
Hereditary barons created by Elizabeth II
Military personnel from London
British Army lieutenant generals